Clarinda Maria Sinnige (born January 14, 1973 in Amsterdam, North Holland) is a former field hockey goalkeeper from the Netherlands, who played 142 international matches for the Dutch National Women's Team.

A player from Amsterdam, Sinnige made her debut on July 5, 1997 against Canada, and was a member of the team, that won bronze at the 2000 Summer Olympics and silver at the 2004 Summer Olympics. She retired from international competition after the Athens Games.

External links
 
 Dutch Hockey Federation

1973 births
Living people
Dutch female field hockey players
Female field hockey goalkeepers
Field hockey players at the 2000 Summer Olympics
Field hockey players at the 2004 Summer Olympics
Medalists at the 2000 Summer Olympics
Medalists at the 2004 Summer Olympics
Olympic bronze medalists for the Netherlands
Olympic field hockey players of the Netherlands
Olympic medalists in field hockey
Olympic silver medalists for the Netherlands
Field hockey players from Amsterdam
21st-century Dutch women